Angry Fist is the second album by Japanese punk rock band, Hi-Standard. It was released on American label, Fat Wreck Chords, in July 1997.

Track listing
All songs written by Hi-Standard, unless otherwise stated.
"Fighting Fists, Angry Soul" – 2:23     
"Stop the Time" – 2:40     
"Endless Trip" – 2:18     
"My Sweet Dog" – 1:35     
"Shy Boy" – 1:59     
"My Heart Feels So Free" – 2:54      
"The Kids Are Alright" (Pete Townshend) – 1:47      
"Gotta Pull Myself Together" (Findon, Myers, Puzey) – 2:26      
"Start Today" – 1:11      
"Sunshine Baby" – 2:17      
"Pathetic Man's Song" – 2:24      
"Have You Ever Seen the Rain?" (John Fogerty) – 1:46      
"Sound of Secret Minds" – 2:23      
"Spread Your Sail" – 2:42
 Contains a hidden track, a punk cover of the "Pink Panther" theme which starts at 3:48 and ends at 5:01

Personnel
 Akihiro Nanba – vocals, bass
 Ken Yokoyama – guitar, vocals
 Akira Tsuneoka – drums
 Recorded at Motor Studio, San Francisco, California, US
 Produced by Ryan Greene and Hi-Standard
 Engineered by Ryan Greene

Certifications and sales

|}

References

External links
Fat Wreck Chords album page

1997 albums
Hi-Standard albums
Fat Wreck Chords albums
Albums produced by Ryan Greene